Joe Higgins is a former Gaelic footballer from County Laois.

In 1998, Higgins added a Leinster Under-21 Football Championship title to his list of honours.

Honours
Club

 2 Laois Senior Football Championship 1996, 2000
 2 Laois All-County Football League 2001, 2010

Inter-county

 1 Leinster Under-21 Football Championship 1998
 1 Leinster Minor Football Championship 1997
 1 All-Ireland Minor Football Championship 1997
 1 Leinster Senior Football Championship 2003

Individual

 1 All Star 2003

References

Year of birth missing (living people)
Living people
Laois inter-county Gaelic footballers
St Joseph's (Laois) Gaelic footballers